Janna Wendy Wyland (November 25, 1964 – September 27, 2003) was a female diver from the United States. More commonly known as Wendy Wyland, she represented her native country at the 1984 Summer Olympics in Los Angeles, California, winning the bronze medal in the Women's 10m Platform competition. Two years earlier, she won the world title in the same event.

Biography
Wyland was born in Jackson, Michigan to parents Vernon and Beth Wyland. Her family moved to Penfield, New York, where she was coached in diving by Betty Perkins-Carpenter from the age of six. When she was 14, she moved to Mission Viejo, California to train under Hall of Fame coach Ron O’Brien. She competed as a member of the Mission Viejo Nadadores Diving Team. While attending Florida Atlantic University at Boca Raton, Florida, Wyland trained for the 1988 Olympics at Mission Bay under O'Brien and alongside fellow athletes Greg Louganis, Michele Mitchell and Kent Ferguson. Wyland was Swimming World magazine's World Platform Diver of the Year in 1982 and 1983.

She moved back to Rochester, New York in the mid-1990s, where she ran the Webster Aquatic Center and then was the head swimming and diving coach pool manager at Rochester Institute of Technology. She died unexpectedly in Rochester, New York. An annual competition, The Wendy Wyland Invitational, bears her name in memorial.

Wyland was engaged to Chad Anthony Lucero in May 1990.  She married David VanDerWoude in 2000 and had one child with him.

Wyland suffered from migraine headaches and dizzy spells for 22 months before her death.  She died suddenly during sleep; an autopsy was performed but was inconclusive about cause of death.  Wyland was survived by her husband David VanDerWoude, her stepdaughter Carley, and daughter Abigayle.  Wyland was buried in the Webster Union Cemetery, Webster, New York.  Her husband established the Wendy Wyland Scholarship Fund for divers in financial need of college scholarships.

She was included in People magazine’s "50 most beautiful people" in 1990 and was inducted into the International Swimming Hall of Fame in 2001.

See also
 List of members of the International Swimming Hall of Fame

References

Wendy Wyland biography, SR/Olympic Sports
"US Olympic Diver Wendy Wyland Dies at 38", Swimming World magazine, September 29, 2003

1964 births
2003 deaths
American female divers
Divers at the 1984 Summer Olympics
Olympic bronze medalists for the United States in diving
Sportspeople from Jackson, Michigan
Medalists at the 1984 Summer Olympics
World Aquatics Championships medalists in diving
Pan American Games gold medalists for the United States
Pan American Games silver medalists for the United States
Pan American Games medalists in diving
Universiade medalists in diving
Divers at the 1983 Pan American Games
Universiade bronze medalists for the United States
Medalists at the 1983 Summer Universiade
Medalists at the 1983 Pan American Games
20th-century American women
21st-century American women